Sanderson High School is a non-denominational secondary school in East Kilbride, South Lanarkshire, Scotland for pupils with additional support needs. The school was established in June 1994 after the merger of Springhall School and Dalton School. The new school buildings were opened officially on 5 February 2009 (though by then had already been in use for some months) as part of South Lanarkshire Council’s Schools’ Modernisation Programme. It is the smallest high school in East Kilbride and shares a campus with Calderglen High School.

References

External links
 Friends of Sanderson

Secondary schools in South Lanarkshire
Buildings and structures in East Kilbride
1994 establishments in Scotland
Educational institutions established in 1994
School buildings completed in 2008
Special schools in Scotland